Star Junction is an unincorporated community and census-designated place in Perry Township, Fayette County, Pennsylvania, United States. The community is located on Pennsylvania Route 51. At the 2010 census, the population was 616.

History
Star Junction was founded in 1893, when the Washington No. 2 Mine was opened by the Washington Coal and Coke Company. It is so-named because it was once the site of a railroad depot, the end of the line for the Washington Run Railroad. Star Junction was once a coal mining center, with beehive ovens for coke manufacture and a foundry. It was the site of labor unrest, including the walkout of 4,500 miners in 1922. Although the company store and mines are long gone, the "patch" (the groups of company houses) still remains and houses many residents. This area was added to the "Determined Eligible List" of the Bureau of Historic Preservation, as an example of a typical coal town, and has been added to the National Register of Historic Places.

Notable person

John Kundla (1916-2017), educator and college/professional basketball coach, was born in Star Junction.

Geography
Star Junction is in northwestern Fayette County, in the southwest part of Perry Township.

Education
Star Junction is served by the Frazier School District.

References

External links

Historic American Engineering Record in Pennsylvania
Census-designated places in Pennsylvania
Pittsburgh metropolitan area
Populated places established in 1893
Census-designated places in Fayette County, Pennsylvania
Historic districts on the National Register of Historic Places in Pennsylvania
National Register of Historic Places in Fayette County, Pennsylvania